Liriano is a Spanish name common in Dominican Republic.

People with Liriano as last/family name 

 Francisco Liriano, Dominican baseball pitcher
 Nelson Liriano, Dominican baseball player
 Pedro Liriano, Dominican baseball player
 Rymer Liriano, Dominican baseball player